Gregory Gucassoff (born 20 April 1985) is a Belgian field hockey player. He competed in the men's tournament at the 2008 Summer Olympics.

References

External links
 

1985 births
Living people
Belgian male field hockey players
Olympic field hockey players of Belgium
Field hockey players at the 2008 Summer Olympics
People from Anderlecht
Field hockey players from Brussels